Hipocentaur (Polish for "Hippocentaur") is a Lithuanian and Polish coat of arms. It was used by a number of szlachta (noble) families under the Polish–Lithuanian Commonwealth.

History
The earliest images of the coat of arms come from 1422, when seals of two brothers from the Holszanski family were attached to the documents of the Treaty of Melno.

Blazon

Notable bearers
Notable bearers of this coat of arms have included:
Paweł Holszański

See also
 Polish heraldry
 Heraldry
 Coat of arms

References

Polish coats of arms